Leicester Stadium were a  motorcycle speedway team which operated from 1929 until 1931.

History
Speedway was first staged in Leicester in 1928 and the following year a team based at Leicester Stadium joined the English Dirt Track League. In 1930 the team joined the Southern League. Financial problems meant that the team failed to complete the 1931 season, with Coventry taking over the remaining fixtures. League speedway was later briefly revived at the stadium in 1937.

Notable riders
Notable Stadium riders include team captain Syd Jackson, Cyril "Squib" Burton, Billy Elmore, Alby Taylor, and John "Slider" Shuttleworth.

Season summary

See also
Speedway in Leicester
Leicester Stadium
Beaumont Park Stadium

References

Sport in Leicester
Defunct British speedway teams